Nick Graham may refer to:

 Nick Graham (American football)
 Nick Graham (Australian footballer) (born 1994), Australian rules footballer 
 Nick Graham (rugby league) (born 1974), Australian rugby league footballer
 Nick Graham (musician), vocalist, songwriter, flautist and bass player
 Nicholas Graham, Canadian businessman and entrepreneur